Curt Menefee (born July 22, 1965) is an American sportscaster who is currently the play-by-play commentator for Seattle Seahawks preseason football, the USFL on Fox and is the host of the Fox Network's NFL pregame show Fox NFL Sunday.

Early life and education
Menefee was born and raised in Atlanta, Georgia.

Menefee earned a Bachelor of Arts degree from Coe College in Cedar Rapids, Iowa. At Coe, he was a member of the Sigma Nu fraternity and inducted into the Sigma Nu Hall of Fame in 2016. He gave the commencement speech at Coe College in 2010 and was awarded an honorary doctorate in Journalism. In 2021, Menefee was attending Northwestern University enrolled in the university's Master's in Public Policy & Administration program with plans to relocate to Chicago full-time.

Career 
Prior to joining Fox Sports full-time, he was a sports reporter for MSG Network's SportsDesk show. Prior to that, he was the sports anchor for WNYW, New York City's Fox flagship station. He also appeared on-air on WTLV in Jacksonville, Florida. He also hosted a radio show on the popular Dallas, Texas sports radio station KTCK ("1310 The Ticket"). He worked at WISC-TV (CBS) in Madison, Wisconsin as a sports anchor and reporter. He was also the sports anchor for Dallas-Fort Worth's then-independent station 
and now CBS affiliate KTVT.

Fox Sports
He began his career at Fox Sports in 1997 as a sideline reporter, then moved to play-by-play for Fox's NFL Europe and Fox NFL coverage on FOX Sports and FSN.

In 2007, Menefee became the host of Fox NFL Sunday.

On May 24, 2008, Menefee made an appearance on MLB on Fox. He held play-by-play duties alongside José Mota during a game between the Los Angeles Angels and the Chicago White Sox.

On May 22, 2010, Menefee hosted Fox's coverage of the UEFA Champions League Final between Inter Milan and Bayern Munich in the first broadcast of that tournament's championship game on over-the-air broadcast television in the United States.

On November 12, 2011, Menefee became the host of the UFC on Fox with Randy Couture and Jon Jones. He continued to serve as host until ESPN took the rights to broadcast UFC.

In 2015, he hosted the inaugural coverage of FOX Sports coverage of the U.S. Open Championship in 2015.

On February 8, 2020, Menefee called an XFL game between the LA Wildcats and the Houston Roughnecks.

NFL Preseason Football 
Menefee called the NFL preseason for the Jaguars TV network from 2005 to 2007. He currently does play-by-play for Seattle Seahawks preseason games with Michael Robinson, Dave Wyman, and Matt Devlin doing color commentary on KCPQ and KZJO (replay).

Boxing
Menefee also provided ringside commentary for Top Rank's coverage of the Pacquiao-Hatton fight. He was also the play-by-play announcer for Showtime Championship Boxing.
On January 7, 2012, Menefee announced he was leaving ShoBox.

Personal life 
Menefee resides in Los Angeles, California.

References

1965 births
Living people
African-American sports journalists
African-American television personalities
American sports journalists
American sports radio personalities
American television sports anchors
American television sports announcers
Association football commentators
Boxing commentators
Coe College alumni
Golf writers and broadcasters
Jacksonville Jaguars announcers
Major League Baseball broadcasters
Mixed martial arts broadcasters
National Football League announcers
Television anchors from New York City
NFL Europe broadcasters
XFL (2020) broadcasters
21st-century American journalists
21st-century African-American people
20th-century African-American people